Ascanio Trombetti (bapt. 27 November 1544 – 20/21 September 1590) was an Italian composer.

He was born in Bologna as a son of Astore Cavallari. In his family, the surname Trombetti was used because of the great ability of its members in playing wind instruments.

In 1590, he was murdered by his lover's husband.

External links
 
 Brief biography

16th-century Italian composers
Italian male composers
1590 deaths
1544 births